Our West Lancashire (OWL) is a localist political party in West Lancashire, United Kingdom. As of May 2021 it held 7 seats on West Lancashire Borough Council. The party also unsuccessfully contested seats in West Lancashire on Lancashire County Council, as well. The group claims to have drawn members from all of the major parties in West Lancashire, and claims to "put residents before the party whip". It is one of two localist parties in West Lancashire, alongside Skelmersdale Independent Party.

History

Our West Lancashire was formed in February 2015 by Adrian Owens, a former Conservative Party councillor, Deputy Leader of West Lancashire Borough Council and candidate for West Lancashire in the 2010 United Kingdom general election, coming second with 17,540 votes, after breaking off from the West Lancashire Conservative group on West Lancashire Borough Council. He was joined by Ian Davis in 2017, who won a by-election on Derby Ward. The group gained a further four seats on West Lancashire Borough Council in the 2019 election.

In 2021, Our West Lancashire gained a further seat in Burscough West which led to the council going to No Overall Control.  As a result, Our West Lancashire councillor, Gordon Paul Johnson became Mayor of West Lancashire and committee chairs were shared between all three political groups with Labour retaining the Leadership of the council.

Policies 

Our West Lancashire is a localist party, and claims to "put residents before the party whip". Their policies include reducing the number of councillors on West Lancashire Borough Council from 54 to 36, a reduction of a third. They also propose policies such as "revitalising" Ormskirk town centre, replacing the swimming pools in Skelmersdale and Ormskirk and improving West Lancashire Borough Council's free tree scheme. OWL also publish data on councillors' attendance and publish a yearly alternative budget.

The group is opposed to the whipping system.

Electoral performance

The group has contested elections successfully on West Lancashire Borough Council and has unsuccessfully contested elections on Lancashire County Council. The group has never contested general elections, although Councillor Adrian Owens, the current Leader of the group, has formerly been a Conservative Party candidate for West Lancashire and South Ribble in the House of Commons.

The group contested the 2021 United Kingdom local elections in West Lancashire and Lancashire.

West Lancashire Borough Council

Our West Lancashire's first councillor was Councillor Adrian Owens, who broke away from the Conservative Party in 2015. He won re-election in 2016 and 2021. The group gained a second councillor, Ian Davis, in a by-election on the Derby ward in 2017. The group gained a further four councillors – Gordon Johnson, Jane Thompson, Kate Mitchell and Ian Rigby – in the 2019 West Lancashire Borough Council election. The group has complete control of the Derby ward.

In the 2022 West Lancashire Borough Council election, Ian Davis retained his Derby ward seat but the group failed to win any of the other seats that it contested.  Our West Lancashire therefore continues to have seven councillors on West Lancashire Borough Council in 2022/23.

Lancashire County Council

Our West Lancashire has previously contested elections on Lancashire County Council, on seats in the West Lancashire Borough Council area. The group came third on the Ormskirk and West Lancashire East wards in the 2017 elections.  In the 2021 elections, they were second in both wards.

Councillors

References

Politics of the Borough of West Lancashire
2015 establishments in the United Kingdom
Locally based political parties in England